Kim Dong-sub (Hanja: 金東燮; born 29 March 1989) is a South Korean football forward who plays for Gangneung City.

Club career 
Despite having represented his country at youth level, Kim never made a first team start for Shimizu S-Pulse in the J1 League due to injuries. On 7 August 2009 he transferred to Tokushima Vortis on loan.

Kim was selected first designate in the 2011 K League Draft by Gwangju FC.

In 2016, Busan IPark loaned Sub out to Ansan Mugunghwa for military duty.

International career 
He was a member of the South Korea national U-20 team at the 2009 FIFA U-20 World Cup.

Club statistics

References

External links

Profile at Korean Football Association
Profile at Yahoo.co.jp 
 

1989 births
Living people
Sportspeople from Gyeonggi Province
South Korean footballers
Association football forwards
South Korean expatriate footballers
Shimizu S-Pulse players
Tokushima Vortis players
Gwangju FC players
Seongnam FC players
Busan IPark players
Ansan Mugunghwa FC players
Seoul E-Land FC players
J1 League players
J2 League players
K League 1 players
K League 2 players
Expatriate footballers in Japan
South Korean expatriate sportspeople in Japan
South Korea under-20 international footballers
South Korea under-23 international footballers
South Korea international footballers